Hristo Kirilov Stamov (born 2 January 1994) is a Bulgarian footballer who plays as a defender.

Career
On 22 June 2017, Stamov signed with Maritsa Plovdiv. On 15 August 2017, he was released by the club due to disciplinary issues.

References

External links

Living people
1994 births
Footballers from Plovdiv
Bulgarian footballers
Bulgaria youth international footballers
First Professional Football League (Bulgaria) players
Second Professional Football League (Bulgaria) players
PFC Lokomotiv Plovdiv players
FC Oborishte players
FC Maritsa Plovdiv players
Association football defenders